Favreau is a surname. Notable people with the surname include:

Jon Favreau, American actor, director, producer, and screenwriter
Jon Favreau (speechwriter), American political commentator
Guy Favreau, Canadian lawyer, politician, and judge
Robert Favreau, Canadian film director and film editor